Starfield is an upcoming action role-playing game developed by Bethesda Game Studios and published by Bethesda Softworks. The video game was formally announced during Bethesda's E3 press conference in 2018. The game takes place in a space-themed setting, and will be the first new intellectual property developed by Bethesda in over twenty-five years. The game is scheduled to be released on September 6, 2023 for Microsoft Windows and Xbox Series X/S.

Setting 
Starfield is set in an area that extends outward from the Solar System for approximately 50 light-years called The Settled Systems. Around the year 2310, the two largest factions in the game, the United Colonies and Freestar Collective, engaged in a conflict called the Colony War. The game takes place 20 years after the war, with the major factions enjoying an uneasy peace. The player assumes the role of a customizable character who is a member of Constellation, an organization of space explorers. The game can be played in either first- or third-person perspectives.

Development 
Starfield represents the first new intellectual property (IP) by Bethesda Game Studios in over twenty-five years, and has been described by director Todd Howard as "Skyrim in space". The studio had been delving into space-themed games since as early as 1994, according to Howard: they had got the rights to make a game based on the Traveller role-playing system, but shortly lost those; their Delta V game in 1994 had been part of this Traveller license but had not been fully realized. Their The 10th Planet was a cancelled space combat game to be published in October 1997 from which the atmosphere of Starfield was derived. Howard stated they had rights to Star Trek in the 2000s and he pitched an idea for a role-playing game in that setting, but this failed to go forward.

While Bethesda had wanted to do a science fiction game for some time and had strong ideas for its gameplay style, it took a while to cement the ideas behind Starfield that would distinguish it from other science fiction games already released. They came onto a theme which lead artist Istvan Pely dubbed as "NASA punk", that although set in humanity's future, the technology can be traced to origins in various NASA space missions. Bethesda's team began crafting a fictional narrative of events by decade of the 300 years to the game's present, in order to ask "And now man is living amongst the stars: what does that mean?", according to Howard.

Starfield’s concept had been in the studio's mind for some time prior to the trademarking of the name in 2013. According to Howard, "There were no other names [we considered]. It had to be 'Starfield'." Howard said active development of the game had been ongoing since the release of Fallout 4 in late 2015. By mid-2018, the game had moved out of pre-production, and was in a playable state.

Marketing and release 
At Bethesda's E3 2018 press conference, Howard presented a short teaser trailer for the game. An in-game teaser trailer was presented at the E3 2021 conference during the combined Microsoft-Bethesda press event, and a release date of November 11, 2022, on Microsoft Windows and Xbox Series X/S as a console exclusive was announced. In May 2022, Bethesda announced that the game's release would be delayed until the first half of 2023, with Howard stating that the additional development time and support from engineers at Microsoft would make Starfield a better game. On March 8, 2023, Bethesda announced that the game would be released on September 6, 2023. A Microsoft-Bethesda press event, Starfield Direct, is scheduled for June 11, 2023 where Bethesda is expected to present more details about the game.

References

External links 
 

Action role-playing video games
Bethesda Game Studios games
Bethesda Softworks games
Open-world video games
Science fiction video games
Single-player video games
Upcoming video games scheduled for 2023
Video games developed in the United States
Video games featuring protagonists of selectable gender
Video games scored by Inon Zur
Video games set in outer space
Video games set in the 24th century
Video games set in the future
Video games set on fictional planets
Video games with customizable avatars
Windows games
Xbox Series X and Series S games